Shelley Michelle is an American fitness model, actress and has been called "the most famous body double in Hollywood".

Work
She claimed she started as a body double with an introductory scene in the 1988 comedy My Stepmother Is an Alien, substituting for Kim Basinger's character's arms and legs, which Basinger has denied.

She provided the body where the face of lead actress Julia Roberts was superimposed for the poster for the 1990 film Pretty Woman, where she also substituted Roberts in scenes that she considered too risqué.

In 1990, she also doubled for Catherine Oxenberg in Overexposed. Oxenberg is part of the Yugoslavian royal family and would not accept nudes in film.

She also had a small acting role in 1992 film The Naked Truth.

In 2006, she was running her own agency Body Doubles and Parts Inc.

Was on an episode of "Who Wants to Date a Comedian" (Joey Medina) in 2011 where she didn't get chosen.

References

External links
 
 

American film actresses
Living people
Year of birth missing (living people)
21st-century American women